South Spreyton is a rural locality in the local government area (LGA) of Kentish in the North-west and west LGA region of Tasmania. The 2016 census recorded a population of 510 for the state suburb of South Spreyton.

History 
South Spreyton is a confirmed locality.

Geography
The boundaries are almost all survey lines.

Road infrastructure 
Route B14 (Sheffield Road) runs through the north-west corner.

References

Towns in Tasmania
Localities of Kentish Council